Soya Milk Sea is the first full album by The Broken Broadcast, released on March 8, 2010.

The album was recorded solo by lead and founder member James Riggall before the inclusion of other members, with contributions by producer David Smith.

Track listing
 "Bloodsuckers" 
 "The Locust" 
 "Pigs Blood" 
 "Dead Leaves" 
 "Nurse Your Swollen Limbs" 
 "Satellite" 
 "Carousel" 
 "Batteries" 
 "The Man Who Mistook His Wife For A Hat"

2010 albums
The Broken Broadcast albums